George Robinson is a former football (soccer) player who represented New Zealand at international level.

Robinson made a single appearance in an official international for New Zealand in a 1–4 loss to South Africa on 19 July 1947.

References 

Year of birth missing
Possibly living people
20th-century New Zealand people
New Zealand association footballers
New Zealand international footballers
Association footballers not categorized by position